Ananta Cucho (possibly from Aymara and Quechua k'uchu corner) is a mountain in the Vilcanota  mountain range in the Andes of Peru, about  high. It is located in the Puno Region, Carabaya Province, on the border of the districts of Corani and Ollachea. Ananta Cucho lies southwest of Yurac Salla, northwest of Taruca Sayana and east of Llusca Ritti and Jori Pintay.

There is a little lake south of Ananta Cucho named Joritoruyoc ("the one with gold mud").

References

Mountains of Peru
Mountains of Puno Region